

This is a list of the National Register of Historic Places listings in Coconino County, Arizona.

It is intended to be a complete list of the properties and districts on the National Register of Historic Places in Coconino County, Arizona, United States. The locations of National Register properties and districts for which the latitude and longitude coordinates are included below, may be seen in a map.

There are 155 properties and districts listed on the National Register in the county, including 11 that are also National Historic Landmarks.  There are also two former listings.

Current listings

|}

Former listings

|}

See also

 List of National Historic Landmarks in Arizona
 National Register of Historic Places listings in Arizona

References

 

Coconino